Gil Penchina is an American business manager. He was formerly the CEO of Wikia Inc., and the vice president and general manager, international at eBay.

He is a 1997 alumnus of the Kellogg School of Management at Northwestern University.

Gil Penchina is also well known for his business angel investments. He founded the angel investor syndicate Flight VC on AngelList and has invested in companies like PayPal, LinkedIn, Ripple, and many others.

References

External links 

 Gil Penchina speech, Stanford Technology Venture Program Entrepreneurial Thought Leaders
 Gil Penchina on Innovation100, Interviewed by World Economic Forum

Living people
Year of birth missing (living people)
Fandom (website)
Place of birth missing (living people)
Kellogg School of Management alumni
American chief executives